The 2020–21 Towson Tigers men's basketball team represented Towson University during the 2020–21 NCAA Division I men's basketball season. The Tigers, led by 10th-year head coach Pat Skerry, played their home games at the SECU Arena in Towson, Maryland as members of the Colonial Athletic Association. In a season limited due to the ongoing COVID-19 pandemic, they finished the season 4–14, 3–9 in CAA play to finish ninth place. They lost to Elon in the first round of the CAA tournament.

Previous season
The Tigers finished the 2019–20 season 19–13, 12–6 in CAA play to finish in third place. They lost in the first round of the CAA tournament to Northeastern.

Offseason

Departures

Incoming transfers

2020 recruiting class

Roster

Schedule and results

|-
!colspan=9 style=| Non-conference regular season
|-

|-
!colspan=9 style=| CAA regular season
|-

|-
!colspan=9 style=| CAA tournament
|-

Source

References

Towson Tigers men's basketball seasons
Towson
Towson
Towson